Interstate 189 (I-189) is an auxiliary Interstate Highway in Chittenden County, Vermont. I-189 is the only auxiliary route of I-89 and the only auxiliary Interstate Highway in Vermont.

Route description
I-189 serves as an Interstate-grade connector between I-89 and a commercial district along US 7 (Shelburne Road). It is signed as an east–west highway. Prior to 2010, only one directional sign had been posted on the highway, on the eastbound side after the on-ramp from US 7. Sign replacements and additions in late 2010 added directional signs on both the eastbound and westbound sides of the route.

History
There was once a plan for the highway to continue north, named as the Southern Connector, into the city of Burlington along the waterfront and service an industrial area. Construction was delayed due to the presence of a toxic barge canal on Pine Street. The alignment was planned go through the barge canal. C-1 Segment I-189 to Home Avenue was built in 1989 and then was eventually canceled as the city largely left behind its industrial past in favor of tourism in the 1980s. The roadway was abandoned just beyond the US 7 interchange.

Future
The federal government previously gave the state a deadline to make a final decision on building the extension or they would lose matching funds. I-189 would extend westward, then turn to the north, terminate at Home Avenue, and connect to the parkway. In August 2014, the parkway received its land use permit, clearing the way for the project to begin. Opposition to the $30-million project and changes to its design have led to delays in construction,  which finally has begun in June 2022.

Exit list 
In 2020, Vermont added mileage-based numbers on existing signs; however, this route is exempted from this change.

Images

References

External links

89-1
89-1
South Burlington, Vermont
Transportation in Chittenden County, Vermont